Canini is an Italian surname. Notable people with the surname include:

 Angelo Canini (1521–1527), Italian grammarian
 Giovanni Angelo Canini (1617–1666), Italian painter and engraver 
 Manuel Canini (born 1993), Italian footballer
 Marcantonio Canini (1622–1669), Italian painter and sculptor
 Michele Canini (born 1985), Italian footballer 
 Renato Canini (1936–2013), Brazilian illustrator

Italian-language surnames